This article covers free indications of frequency, probability, volition and obligation.

Gerundive tenses

Present gerundive
The gerundive of the verb (an adjectival form ending in -ndus) can be combined with the verb  'I am' to make a passive periphrastic tense. This usually expresses what is needing to be done:
 (Pliny)
'I don't need to be asked or encouraged' (i.e. I will do it willingly)

 (Celsus)
'tumours of this kind need to be lanced'

Negative
The negative gerundive usually means 'not needing to be', as in the first example above. However, sometimes the interpretation 'ought not to be' or 'it isn't possible for it to be' is more appropriate:
 (Seneca)
'you do not need to be reminded now that no one is good except the wise man'

 (Ovid)
'the story of Achilles shouldn't (or can't) be told using the metre of Callimachus'

Impersonal construction
Very often the passive periphrastic is used impersonally, together with a dative of the agent:

 (Cicero)
'a decision needs to be made by you today'

The impersonal form of this tense can also be made using intransitive verbs such as  'I go' and verbs such as  'I persuade' and  'I use' which do not take an accusative object:

 (Cicero)
'there is no need to reply to everything'

 (Cicero)
'I have to go to Arpinum'

 (Cicero)
'you must use your judgement'

Future gerundive
An example of a future gerundive periphrastic is the following:
 (Cicero)
'since that isn't possible, we will need to ask my friend, Marcus Plaetorius'

Imperfect gerundive
An example of the imperfect passive periphrastic is the following:
 (Cicero)
'he was afraid not only of those things which needed to be feared, but everything'

Perfect gerundive
As with the active perfect periphrastic, in a conditional sentence the perfect gerundive periphrastic tense can mean 'would have done':
 (Livy)
'if you had delayed just one day, you would all have died'

Another meaning of the perfect passive is 'ought to have been done':
 (Cicero)
'either his army should have been taken away or he should have been given the command'

In the following result clause, this tense becomes subjunctive:
 (Cicero)
'what you write about Pomptinus is correct: for the fact is that, if he is going to be in Brundisium before the 1st June, it wasn't so necessary for Marcus Anneius and Lucius Tullius to have been urged to hurry'

Future perfect gerundive
The active future perfect periphrastic tense is not found, but the passive occurs:
 (Vitruvius)
'whenever (at some future time) it is necessary for a building to be made (using local stone), the stones for it should be quarried two years in advance'

For gerundive infinitive tenses see #Gerundive infinitives below.

Subjunctive tenses

Wishes 
The present subjunctive can express a wish for the future (the word  is usually added):

 (Cicero)
'I hope I may see that day!'

The negative is :

 (Cicero)
'may I not live if I know!'

Less commonly, the perfect subjunctive expresses a wish for the past, leaving open the possibility that it may have happened:

 (Cicero)
'may I have prophesied correctly!'

 (Virgil)
'may it turn out that Trojan ill-fortune has followed us this far, no further!'

The perfect subjunctive can also be used in a wish for the future, but this use is described as 'archaic'.

 (Cicero)
'but may the gods avert this omen!'

The imperfect and pluperfect subjunctive are used in wishes to represent an imagined or wished for situation or event which is no longer capable of fulfilment:

 (Cicero)
'if only Servius Sulpicius were alive!'

 (Cicero)
'if only he had led out all his forces with him!'

In the following sentence, the imperfect subjunctive  is used to wish for something that cannot now come true, while the present subjunctive  leaves open the possibility that it may be true:

 (Cicero)
'I wish it had been true about Menedemus; I hope it may be true about the queen'

Jussive subjunctive 
When the present subjunctive has a jussive or hortatory meaning, it can be a suggestion or command in the 1st or 3rd person:

 (Catullus)
'let's live, my Lesbia, and let's love'

 (Gellius)
'let him sit here!'

 (Cicero)
'let them go out, let them depart; let them not allow poor Catiline to waste away with desire for them!'

In philosophy it can set the scene for a discussion:

 (Cicero)
'let us suppose that a good man is selling a house'

The jussive subjunctive is only used in the 2nd person when the person is indefinite:

 (Virgil)
'may you arise, some avenger, from our bones!'

Another use of the present or perfect subjunctive is concessive:

 (Cicero)
'he may be a thief, he may be a temple robber, he may be the leader of all outrages and vices; nonetheless he is a good general!'

 (Cicero)
'he may have been so to others; when did begin to be so to you?'

The present and imperfect subjunctives are also used in deliberative questions (which are questions which expect an imperative answer):

 (Cicero)
'what action should I take about Pompey?'

 (Virgil)
'what was I to do?'

With the negative particle  the perfect subjunctive can express a negative command:

'you should not fear death'

As with wishes and conditional sentences, the imperfect and pluperfect subjunctives can represent a situation which, because it is in the past, cannot now be changed. They describe something which should have been done in the past, but which it is now too late for:

 (Virgil)
'you should have remained true to your words, o Alban!'

 (Cicero)
'he should have died, you will say'

This usage is quite common in Plautus but rare in later Latin.

The jussive pluperfect is also fairly uncommon. The following examples are from Cicero, again using the negative :

 (Cicero)
'you shouldn't have asked'

 (Cicero)
'what was it your duty to do? you ought to have returned the money, you ought not to have bought the corn'

Possibility 
After the word  'perhaps' and occasionally after  'perhaps', the present subjunctive can mean 'may' or 'could', expressing a possibility. The first example below uses the present subjunctive, and the second the perfect:

 (Cicero)
'this may perhaps seem harsh'

 (Cicero)
'perhaps I have acted rashly'

In the following sentence, using the pluperfect subjunctive, according to one view, Queen Dido contemplates what 'might have been':

 (Virgil)
'I could have carried torches into the camp and filled the gangways with flames'

Others see the pluperfect subjunctive in this sentence as a wish ('if only I had carried!'); others again as jussive ('I ought to have carried!').

Archaic mode for volitition 

It occurs mostly in Plautus and Terence, but sometimes also in Cicero, in phrases like the following:
 (Plautus)
'may the gods destroy you!'

Sigmatic aorist mode for volition 
In old Latin, a form of the subjunctive with -s-, known as the sigmatic aorist subjunctive, is preserved ( etc.). One use of this is for wishes for the future:

 (Plautus)
'may the gods preserve you always!'

 (Cicero)
'may the gods ensure that it be allowed'

In Plautus this subjunctive is also used in prohibitions, when it exists:
 (Plautus)
'don't worry about me!'

In other phrases it has a potential meaning and can be translated with 'would':
 (Plautus)
'I would willingly do him harm!'

 (Livy)
'I do not know exactly, nor, if I knew, would I dare to say'

Aspect comparison

Eram vs fuī as state verbs
In the verb  'I am', the imperfect tense  and the perfect  both mean 'I was', but in Latin there is usually a difference. As with other verbs, the perfect is usually used when the length of time is mentioned:

 (Livy)
'for a long time there was silence'

 (Cicero)
'for many years he was blind'

But if the situation was still continuing at the time referred to, the imperfect is used:

 (Livy)
'the cavalry battle had been in doubt for a long time already (and was still in doubt)'

The perfect is also used when the sentence describes an event rather than a state:

 (Livy)
'that year there were huge floods and the Tiber inundated the flat areas of the city'

 (Cicero)
'you were therefore there at Laeca's house that night, Catiline!' (i.e. you attended the meeting)

Another use of the perfect  is to describe a former state, emphasising that it is no longer in existence:

 (Petronius)
'I was once just like you are'

 (Livy) 
'there used to be a statue of Attus to the left of the senate house'

 (Virgil)
'we have ceased to be Trojans; Troy is no more'

However, if a time adverb such as  'once upon a time' is added, there is no need for the perfect tense and the imperfect  is more usual:

 (Horace)
'once I was a fig-wood log, a useless piece of timber'

 (Horace)
'I am not the kind of man I was under the rule of good Cinara'

The perfect is also used in sentences such as the following, which describe a permanent state, as opposed to the imperfect, which describes a temporary one:

 (Terence)
'my mother was a Samian; she was living in Rhodes (at that time)'

 (Caesar)
'among the Helvetians by far the noblest and the most wealthy was Orgetorix'

According to Pinkster, the use of erat in these two examples would sound wrong. 'In both cases the reader would want to know "What happened next?"'

For geographical description, on the other hand, erat is used, describing the landscape was it was at the time of the narrative:

 (Caesar)
'on that river there was a bridge'

'to the north there was a hill."

The use of  here would imply that there used to be a bridge, but that it has now gone. 

The perfect must also be used with adverbs such as  'once',  'twice',  'three times', which imply that the situation is now over:

 (Cicero)
'I have been in Bithynia twice'

The perfect is also used for something which has always been (or never been) the case:

 (Livy)
'we have never been enemies, always allies'

The adverb , when referring to a past period of time, can have either tense:

 (Nepos)
'on several occasions he was in charge of armies'

 (Ovid)
'often I was your judge, often your teacher'

There are also some types of sentences where either tense may be used indifferently, for example when describing someone's name or character:

 /  (Livy)
'his name was Manus' / 'his name was Dinomenes'

 /  (Nepos)
'he was a hard-working general' / 'he was an excellent general'

The equivalent of these two tenses, Spanish  and  both meaning 'I was', still exist in Spanish and Portuguese today. (See Spanish conjugation, Portuguese verb conjugation.)

Eram vs fuī as passive auxiliary

According to de Melo it is not always possible to tell from the context whether the tense with  refers to an anterior time or is merely a stylistic variation of an ordinary perfect passive.

 (Plautus)
'I came here on a boat; I am still feeling seasick'

 (Plautus)
'I (originally) sailed from here to Egypt'

In the following examples, both from the same scene, the meaning of the double perfect seems to be the same as an ordinary perfect:

 (Plautus)
'what I swore that I would do, I have done'

 (Plautus)
'what you ordered, I have done'

Similarly, the following two examples use different tenses, although the context is very similar and the meaning is the same:

 (Plautus)
'there's something which I almost forgot to say (earlier) in the house (i.e. before we left the house)'

 (Plautus)
'I forgot to tell you when we were inside just now'

There is a difference, however, since only the  form can be used in sentences like the following where the verb has a present perfect meaning:

 (Plautus)
'I don't know ... I've forgotten everything' 

Thus in the following example, according to the 19th-century grammarian Madvig, the words  do not describe an event but the state in which the temple of Janus was in:

 (Livy)
'since Numa's reign the temple of Janus has been in a closed state only twice'

It refers to a previous situation which has now changed:

 (Cicero)
'almost all the things which have now been included in the Arts were once dispersed and scattered'

De Melo cites the following example, where the second verb is obviously not anterior to the first:

 (Vitruvius)
'the pictures having been cut out were packed in wooden crates and were brought into the comitium'

An example is the following:

'and after that day no one dared to ask him any questions any more'

Tense/Mode options

Here are some examples of Latin verbs with modal meaning (frequency, possibility, volition, obligation, atemporality) or verb forms determined by conjunctions.

The imperfect indicative generally has an imperfective meaning and describes situations in the past. Often the imperfect can be translated into English as 'was doing', but sometimes the simple tense 'did' or expressions such as 'used to do', 'would do', 'kept doing', 'began to do', 'had been doing' are more appropriate.

'Perfect indicative' usage

'I was sent, I have been sent',  'I was led, I have been led'.

Some perfect tenses have an irregular stem, for example  'I am',  'I go',  'I bring, I bear',  'I raise, I remove'.

The Latin perfect has a dual meaning. It can describe a past event with a present result (e.g. 'he has died (and is laying dead somewhere)') or a past event without a present result (e.g. 'he died (last year)').

 (Caesar)
'this day generally makes the highest tides'

Experiential perfect
As with the English perfect, the Latin perfect can sometimes be used to relate experiences which have happened several times in the past:

 (Cicero)
'I have often seen public meetings shout out loud when the words fell aptly (i.e. with a striking rhythm)'

 (Cicero)
'as I've often told you, I am very fond of Appius'

 (Cicero)
'you have always loved me'

 (Cicero)
'he lives with me, and has always done so'

Gnomic perfect
Similar to this is the 'gnomic perfect', which states a general truth based on past experience:

 (Horace)
'a heap of bronze and gold has never taken away fevers from the body' (i.e. doesn't take away)

 (Juvenal)
'no one has ever become totally shameless suddenly'

Iterative action in a temporal or relative clause

In sentences which mean 'whenever X occurs, Y occurs', referring to general time, the perfect tense is used for event X if it precedes event Y. In English the present tense is often used:
 (Cicero)
'while I am reading, I agree, but as soon as I have put the book down all that agreement slips away'

 (Cicero)
'whenever I come here, this very "doing nothing" delights me'

In a past-time temporal clause
The perfect tense is usually used in temporal clauses after  'after',  'when',  'as soon as',  'as soon as'. Here English often uses the pluperfect tense:

 (Sallust)
'after he (had) said this, he ordered the signal to be sounded'

It is also used in a past-time relative clause referring to an anterior action where similarly English might use a pluperfect:

 (Cicero)
'he lost the army which he had received'

Length of time
The perfect, not the imperfect, is used when a situation is said to have lasted in the past for a certain length of time, but is now over. (The imperfect, however, with a length of time, is used for a situation which was still going on at the time referred to; see the examples above.)

 (Cicero)
'he lived for ninety years'

 (Seneca)
'Cassius drank water throughout his whole life'

 (Livy)
'but the peace with Alba did not last long'

 (Cicero)
'all the Consuls before you obeyed the Senate'

However, the phrase  with the perfect tense means 'long ago':

 (Cicero)
'I heard this long ago, judges; I am sure there is none of you who hasn't often heard it'

 (Plautus)
'the crime, I say, was committed long ago; it is old and ancient'

'Pluperfect indicative' usage

Iterative use in temporal clauses
In subordinate clauses of the type 'whenever...', 'whoever...' etc. in past time the pluperfect indicative is used if the event precedes the event of the main clause. Usually in English the simple past is used:
 (Cicero)
'it was only whenever he saw a rose that he thought that spring was beginning'

 (Cicero)
'at the end of the journey, whenever he came to some town, he would be carried in the same litter straight into his bedroom'

In later writers such as Livy, the pluperfect subjunctive is used in a similar context.

Potential meaning ('would have')
Sometimes in a conditional clause a pluperfect indicative can have the meaning of a potential pluperfect subjunctive ('would have'), when it refers to an event which very nearly took place, but did not:
 (Florus)
'the war would have been completely finished, if (Caesar) had been able to crush Pompey at Brundisium'

'Periphrastic future' usage

'Imperfect' auxiliary
In a conditional sentence this tense can mean 'would have done':
 (Ovid)
'I was going to remove the faults (i.e. I would have removed them), if I had been free to do it'

'Perfect indicative' auxiliary
This tense can also be potential, expressing the meaning 'would have done':
 (Curtius)
'if I had not obeyed you, I would rightly have paid the penalty'

'Pluperfect indicative' auxiliary
An example of this tense is the following:
 (Livy)
'... whom the Senate had been intending to order should be declared dictator'

'Present subjunctive' auxiliary
In indirect statements and questions, the active periphrastic future can represent a future or periphrastic future tense of direct speech in primary sequence. In this case there is not necessarily any idea of planning or intention, although there may be:
 (Cicero)
'I don't know when I'm going to see you'

 (Cicero)
'let me know in detail what you are doing and whether at all you'll be coming to Italy this winter'

This tense can also be used in primary sequence reported speech, to represent the main clause in either an ideal conditional sentence or a simple future one (the distinction between these two disappears in indirect speech):
 (Cicero)
'we ourselves have never seen such a (perfectly wise) man; but it is explained in the opinions of philosophers what such a person would be like, if one were ever to exist'

'Imperfect subjunctive' auxiliary
If the main verb is in past time, an imperfect version of the periphrastic future subjunctive is used:
 (Cicero)
'I wasn't sure whether you were going to receive this letter'

 (Sallust)
'he said that he had come to ask him whether he was intending to make peace or war'

'Perfect subjunctive' auxiliary
A perfect periphrastic subjunctive can be used with a conditional meaning ('would have done') in hypothetical conditional clauses in indirect questions in primary sequence. In this case it represents a pluperfect subjunctive in the original direct speech:
 (Livy)
'tell us, Appius Claudius, what you would have done, if you had been censor at that time?'

 (Cicero)
'can anyone doubt that if Quintus Ligarius had been able to be in Italy, he would have been of the same opinion as his brothers were?'

In an indirect question, the perfect periphrastic subjunctive can also sometimes reflect a potential imperfect subjunctive:
 (Seneca)
'imagine how much speed you would be putting on, if an enemy were threatening you from behind!'

These tenses can be compared with the similar examples with the perfect periphrastic infinitive cited below, where a conditional sentence made in imperfect subjunctives is converted to an indirect statement.

'Pluperfect subjunctive' auxiliary
The pluperfect version of the periphrastic subjunctive can be used in a circumstantial  clause:
 (Cicero)
'when Antony had been about to bring some motion about the republic, a message suddenly arrived about the 4th legion and he lost his composure'

It can also be used in conditional sentences after , as in the following sentence from an imaginary letter from Helen to Paris:
 (Ovid)
'by flatteries such as these, if I had been going to sin, I might have been persuaded'

Once in Cicero it occurs in the apodosis of an unreal conditional, referring to the inevitability of fate:

 (Cicero) 
'even if he had obeyed the auspices, the same thing would have been destined to happen; for the fates cannot be changed'

It can also reflect a potential pluperfect subjunctive ('would have done') in historic sequence in an indirect question:
 (Livy)
'it occurred to them how impossible Etruria would have been, if anything had gone wrong in Samnium'

Historic infinitive
The present infinitive is occasionally used in narrative as a tense in its own right. It usually describes a scene in which the same action was being done repeatedly. There are often two or more historic infinitives in succession. When the subject is expressed, it is in the nominative case (distinguishing the historic infinitive from the accusative and infinitive of reported speech).

 (Sallust)
'then there was a ghastly spectacle on the open plains: people kept chasing, fleeing, being killed, being captured'

 (Cicero)
'the poor man kept shouting, as he was being dragged away, that he had done nothing'

 (Cicero)
'he by turns kept begging them, then threatening, now offering hope, now fear'

'Could have done'
The perfect tense  with the infinitive can often mean 'I was able to' or 'I managed to':

 (Cicero)
'Scipio managed to make Publius Rupilius Consul, but he wasn't able to do the same for Rupilius's brother Lucius'

However, it can also mean 'I could have done (but did not)':
 (Cicero)
'what I was and what I could have been, I can now no longer be'

 (Juvenal)
'(Cicero) could have despised Antony's swords (i.e. would have had no reason to fear them), if he had spoken everything in this way!'

 (Cicero)
'you ask what more Plancius could have achieved, if he had been the son of Gnaeus Scipio'

The pluperfect subjunctive after  also means 'could have':

 (Livy)
'although he could have led them out into battle, Aemilius held his troops inside the wall of the camp'

'Ought to have done'
'Ought to have done' is often expressed with a past tense of  'I have a duty to' or  'it is fitting' together with a present infinitive:
 (Cicero)
'you ought not to have come to the Senate on that day'

 (Cicero)
'you ought to have been put to death long ago by order of the Consul, Catiline!'

Sometimes,  means 'it must be the case that...':

 (Cicero)
'if there was a lot of dust on his shoes, he must have been coming from a journey'

Sometimes, in familiar style,  can be used with the perfect infinitive passive:
 (Cicero)
'this ought to have been done long ago'

The indirect speech form is regularly  with the present infinitive:
 (Cicero)
'they say I ought not to have built the house'

Indirect commands with the infinitive

Indirect commands are made with two constructions: either  (or ) with the present or imperfect subjunctive, or the accusative and infinitive construction, using the present infinitive. The latter construction is used especially when the main verb is  'I order' or  'I forbid', but also sometimes after  'I command':

 (Caesar)
'he ordered the signal to be given'

 (Cicero)
'what tyrant has ever forbidden unhappy people to mourn?'

References

Latin grammar